The eastern cut-off is a variant of the "scissors" high jump style
involving a layout. This enables the jumper to clear a higher bar  
than with the traditional scissors style, while still landing on 
the feet. The technique is generally credited to Michael Sweeney of the New York Athletic Club, 
who used it in 1895 to set a world record of 6 ft 5 5/8 inches (1.97 m).
The style came to be called "eastern" because of its origin on the US 
east coast, after the invention of the rival "western roll" style by
George Horine on the west coast (Stanford). Horine was in fact the first to
improve on Sweeney's record, when he cleared 6 ft 7 inches (2.01 m) in 1912.

Although succeeded by the more efficient layout techniques of
the western roll and (in the 1930s) by the straddle, the eastern
cut-off continued to be competitive at an international level until
the 1940s in the men's high jump, and until the 1960s in the women's
high jump. It was used by John Winter of Australia to win the high 
jump in the Olympics of 1948, and by Iolanda Balas of Romania to win 
the women's high jump in the Olympics of 1960 and 1964. Even today, 
the eastern cut-off is used by high school jumpers in Kenya, where the 
lack of foam landing mats necessitates a style where jumpers land on 
their feet.

The eastern cut-off is a very beautiful and complex style involving
contrary rotations of the body and legs. A jumper taking off from the
left foot crosses the bar with the right leg first, left leg roughly 
parallel to the bar, with the body still on the takeoff side and twisted 
(opposite to the rotation of the left leg) to face downwards. After crossing 
the bar the legs are rapidly "scissored": this undoes the twist and 
the jumper lands gracefully on the takeoff foot, facing the bar.

References

High jump
Sport of athletics terminology